Aleksei Gerasimov may refer to:
 Aleksei Gerasimov (footballer, born 1973), Russian footballer
 Aleksei Gerasimov (footballer, born 1993), Russian footballer
 Aleksei Gerasimov (footballer, born 1999), Russian footballer